Mariana Sandoval is an American politician and paralegal. She is a Democratic member of the Arizona House of Representatives elected to represent District 23 in 2022. 

Sandoval worked as a paralegal in various legal aid offices and for 12 years at the Arizona Attorney General's office. From 2017 to 2020, she served on the governing board of the Agua Fria Union High School District. A resident of Goodyear, Arizona, in 2022, she was elected to represent District 23 in the Arizona House of Representatives.

References

External links 

 
 Biography at Ballotpedia

Democratic Party members of the Arizona House of Representatives
Living people
Year of birth missing (living people)
21st-century American women politicians
Women state legislators in Arizona
Hispanic and Latino American state legislators in Arizona
21st-century American politicians
Paralegals